Maria My Darling is a 1980 Indian action thriller film directed by Durai and starring Kamal Haasan and Sripriya. The film, a bilingual, was shot in Tamil and Kannada languages.

Plot 
Maria, a bold woman, searches for and seeks revenge against her mothers killer.

Cast 
Kamal Haasan
Sripriya
R. N. Sudarshan
K. Natraj

Kannada version
Vajramuni
Shivaram
M. P. Shankar
Udaykumar
Balakrishna
Baby Indira
Kunigal Nagabhushan

Tamil version
Srikanth
Ravikanth
Thengai Srinivasan
V. S. Raghavan
Major Sundarrajan
Jayamalini

Production 
The film was shot in Bangalore.

Soundtrack 
Shankar–Ganesh composed the music for the soundtracks with Tamil lyrics penned by Kannadasan, Aalangudi Somu and Pulamaipithan. Kannada lyrics penned by Chi. Udayashankar.

Reception 
The film was a box-office bomb.

References

External links 

1980 action thriller films
1980 films
1980s Kannada-language films
1980 multilingual films
1980s Tamil-language films
Films directed by Durai
Films scored by Shankar–Ganesh
Indian action thriller films
Indian films about revenge
Indian multilingual films